Ryan Nicholas Carpenter (born August 22, 1990) is an American professional baseball pitcher who is currently a free agent. He has played in Major League Baseball (MLB) for the Detroit Tigers and in the Chinese Professional Baseball League (CPBL) for the Rakuten Monkeys as well as in the Korea Baseball Organization for the Hanwha Eagles.

Career
Carpenter was drafted by the Tampa Bay Rays in the 21st round of the 2008 Major League Baseball draft out of Cactus High School in Glendale, Arizona. He did not sign and played college baseball at Gonzaga University. In 2010 and 2011, he played collegiate summer baseball with the Orleans Firebirds of the Cape Cod Baseball League.

Carpenter was again drafted by the Rays, this time in the seventh round of the 2011 MLB draft and signed. He was released by the Rays on March 21, 2014, and signed by the Colorado Rockies to a minor league contract on May 7. Carpenter remained in the Rockies minor league system until November 6, 2017, when he elected free agency.

Detroit Tigers
The Detroit Tigers signed Carpenter to a major league deal in November 2017. On April 1, 2018, Carpenter made his Major League debut with the Tigers when he was called up to start the second game of a double-header against the Pittsburgh Pirates as the 26th man. He pitched three innings in which he gave up five hits and three earned runs while striking out three and walking one; he did not earn a decision as the Pirates defeated the Tigers 8–6. Carpenter was again called up as the 26th man in a double-header on May 12, 2018. He came out of the bullpen in the fifth inning of the second game. Carpenter was called up to make another spot start six days later where he earned his first career loss after giving up five earned runs. He stayed on the 25 man roster for two days this time before being sent back down to Toledo. Ryan was next called up on May 30, the fourth time of the season, to start in place of an injured player. During his start the next day, Carpenter himself suffered an injury when he strained his right oblique, which landed him on the 10-day disabled list.

Recalled again on August 17, 2018, due to an injury to Tiger starter Blaine Hardy, Carpenter earned his first major league win over the Minnesota Twins the next night, surrendering three runs over  innings. The following season, Carpenter pitched in 9 starts for Detroit, going 1-6 before being designated for assignment.

Carpenter was released by the Tigers on September 3, 2019.

Rakuten Monkeys
On January 11, 2020, Carpenter signed with the Rakuten Monkeys of the Chinese Professional Baseball   League. Carpenter won a Gold Glove award as a pitcher in the 2020 season.

Hanwha Eagles
On November 28, 2020, Carpenter signed a one-year, $300,000 deal with the Hanwha Eagles of the KBO League. On December 28, 2021, Carpenter re-signed with the Eagles for the 2022 season for $750,000. He was released on May 31, 2022.

References

External links

1990 births
Living people
Albuquerque Isotopes players
Baseball players from Arizona
American expatriate baseball players in Taiwan
American expatriate baseball players in South Korea
Bowling Green Hot Rods players
Charlotte Stone Crabs players
Detroit Tigers players
Gonzaga Bulldogs baseball players
Hanwha Eagles players
Hudson Valley Renegades players
Major League Baseball pitchers
Modesto Nuts players
New Britain Rock Cats players
Orleans Firebirds players
Rakuten Monkeys players
Sportspeople from Glendale, Arizona
Anchorage Glacier Pilots players